San Miguel de Gaser Airport  is a public use airport located near Sipuati, Beni, Bolivia.

See also

Transport in Bolivia
List of airports in Bolivia

References

External links 
OpenStreetMap - Sipuati
OurAirports - Sipuati

FallingRain - Sipuati

Airports in Beni Department